North Macedonia, previously presented as the former Yugoslav Republic of Macedonia (F.Y.R. Macedonia), has participated in the Eurovision Song Contest 21 times since its official debut in 1998. The country had attempted to participate in 1996, but failed to qualify from the audio-only qualifying round. The current Head of Delegation is Meri Popova.

History
Prior to declaring independence in 1991, as a constituent country of SFR Yugoslavia, the Socialist Republic of Macedonia participated in the Yugoslav pre-selection called among the other Yugoslav federal units.  Also, Macedonian composers wrote songs for candidates from other parts of Yugoslavia. However, the Macedonian entries never managed to win, and the SR Macedonia was the only federal state never to send a Yugoslav entry to the Eurovision Song Contest. An exception occurred when Maja Odžaklievska won the Yugoslav competition in 1980, but she did not perform in the Eurovision Song Contest 1980 due to the Yugoslavian decision not to participate that year.

As the Former Yugoslav Republic of Macedonia (FYR Macedonia), the country submitted its first entry, "Samo ti" (Само ти) sung by Kaliopi, for the 1996 edition. However, the country failed to qualify through the non-broadcast pre-selection round. Its efforts to enter the contest were again hindered in 1997, when another new system was introduced where countries with the lowest average scores over the previous four years were excluded from participating. The country made its debut in 1998, with Vlado Janevski's "Ne zori, zoro".

It is the only country to have qualified from every semi-final from 2004 to 2007 (other countries have qualified for every final but due to them finishing in the top 10 the previous year, they did not have to compete in the semi-final).

Macedonian Radio Television (MRT), which broadcasts the event, has intermittently used the Skopje Fest to select the national entry since the country's debut, although it made several changes in the national final format, so the 2004, 2005 and 2006 national finals were organised outside the Skopje Fest.

For , the country competed for the first time under its new name, North Macedonia. MRT selected Tamara Todevska as their act of choice, performing the song "Proud". The song managed to qualify through the second semi-final, and reached seventh place in the final, winning the jury vote. This is the first top ten placing as well as the highest placing ever for North Macedonia in the history of the contest. However, MRT will still broadcast the 2023 contest with a view to return in 2024.

Participation overview

Awards

Barbara Dex Award

Related involvement

Commentators and spokespersons

Photogallery

See also 
North Macedonia in the Junior Eurovision Song Contest
North Macedonia in the Turkvision Song Contest

Notes and references

Notes

References

External links 
Points to and from North Macedonia eurovisioncovers.co.uk
Eurovision North Macedonia

 
Countries in the Eurovision Song Contest